Stratford High School may refer to:

Schools in the United States
Stratford High School (Connecticut), in Stratford, Connecticut
Stratford High School (Houston), in Houston, Texas
Stratford High School (Stratford, Texas), in Stratford, Texas
Stratford High School (South Carolina), in Goose Creek, South Carolina
Stratford High School (Tennessee), in Nashville, Tennessee
Stratford High School (Wisconsin), in Stratford, Wisconsin

Other schools
Stratford High School, New Zealand, in Stratford, New Zealand
Stratford-upon-Avon School, in Stratford-upon-Avon, England

See also
Stratford Central Secondary School, in Stratford, Ontario, Canada
Stratford-upon-Avon College, in Stratford-upon-Avon, England
Stratford School (disambiguation)